Meganoton is a genus of moths in the family Sphingidae.

Species
Meganoton analis (R. Felder, 1874)
Meganoton hyloicoides Rothschild, 1910
Meganoton loeffleri Eitschberger, 2003
Meganoton nyctiphanes (Walker, 1856)
Meganoton rubescens Butler, 1876
Meganoton yunnanfuana Clark, 1925

 
Sphingini
Moth genera
Taxa named by Jean Baptiste Boisduval